In enzymology, a cyclopropane-fatty-acyl-phospholipid synthase is an enzyme that catalyzes the chemical reaction

S-adenosyl-L-methionine + phospholipid olefinic fatty acid  S-adenosyl-L-homocysteine + phospholipid cyclopropane fatty acid

Thus, the two substrates of this enzyme are S-adenosyl methionine and phospholipid olefinic fatty acid, whereas its two products are S-adenosylhomocysteine and phospholipid cyclopropane fatty acid.

This enzyme belongs to the family of transferases, specifically those transferring one-carbon group methyltransferases.  The systematic name of this enzyme class is S-adenosyl-L-methionine:unsaturated-phospholipid methyltransferase (cyclizing). Other names in common use include cyclopropane synthetase, unsaturated-phospholipid methyltransferase, cyclopropane synthase, cyclopropane fatty acid synthase, cyclopropane fatty acid synthetase, and CFA synthase.

Structural studies

References

 
 

EC 2.1.1
Enzymes of known structure